Magna Carta is the first of a series of constitutional charters in English law.

Magna Carta may also refer to:

Music
 Magna Carta (band), an English folk rock band
 Magna Carta... Holy Grail, a 2013 album by Jay-Z
 Magna Carta Records, a music label

Places
 Magna Carta Island, in the River Thames in England
 Magna Carta Place, in Canberra, Australia
 Magna Carta Memorial, at Runnymede, England

Video games
 Magna Carta (series)
 Magna Carta: The Phantom of Avalanche, a 2001 Korean RPG video game
 Magna Carta: Crimson Stigmata, a 2004 Korean RPG video game
 MagnaCarta 2, a 2009 Korean RPG videogame

Other uses
 Magna Carta (barge), a hotel barge
 Magna Carta (Italy), a think tank within The People of Freedom political party
 Magna Carta (An Embroidery), an artwork by Cornelia Parker
 Magna Carta revolt of 1213-1215
 The Magna Carta School, a school in Surrey, England

See also
 Magna Carta Hiberniae, an issue of the English Magna Carta, or Great Charter of Liberties in Ireland